The Portland Timbers are an American professional men's soccer club based in Portland, Oregon. The Timbers compete in Major League Soccer (MLS) as a member club of the league's Western Conference. The Timbers have played their home games at Providence Park since 2011, when the team began play as an expansion team in the league.

The club was founded in 2009, when the city of Portland was awarded an expansion berth to Major League Soccer. The team operating rights are owned by Peregrine Sports under the majority ownership of Merritt Paulson, whose companies had acquired the then-USL Pro team in 2007 and later established the Portland Thorns women's team in 2012 (all MLS franchises are centrally owned by the league itself, which grants operating rights and privileges to the individual club "owners," who are also shareholders in MLS). The club is a phoenix club, and the fourth soccer franchise based in Portland (second top-level) to carry the legacy of the Timbers name, which originated with the team that competed in the North American Soccer League (NASL) from 1975 to 1982.

In 2013, the Timbers finished the regular season in first place in the Western Conference, clinching both their first-ever playoff appearance and a CONCACAF Champions League berth. In 2015, the franchise won the Western Conference Finals in the playoffs, and their first major trophy, the MLS Cup, becoming the first team in Cascadia to do so. In 2017, the club again finished the regular season in first place in the Western Conference. In 2018, the Timbers again made the playoffs, advancing in three rounds, defeating archrival Seattle in the semifinals along the way, and made the MLS Cup where they lost 2–0 to Atlanta United FC. In 2020, the Timbers won the one-off MLS is Back Tournament, defeating Orlando City SC in the final, and once again qualified for the Champions League. In 2021, the Timbers won the Western Conference and once again were runners-up in MLS Cup, falling to New York City FC 4–2 on penalties after a 1–1 score at extra time.

Portland has long-standing rivalries with nearby clubs Seattle Sounders and Vancouver Whitecaps FC, with whom they compete for the Cascadia Cup.

History

Soccer roots in Portland and first MLS seasons 

Professional soccer in Portland, Oregon can be traced to the soccer team that competed in the top-level North American Soccer League (NASL) as an expansion team from 1975 until the club's seventh season in 1982. The club's major achievement was in their inaugural season during the league's playoffs, having won the league's division final, and runners-up in Soccer Bowl '75 losing to the Tampa Bay Rowdies in the championship match. In 1985, F.C. Portland had established and was a charter club in the Western Soccer Alliance League and competed until folding in 1990. Professional soccer was dormant in the city until 2001, when the USL Timbers was founded and competed in Division 2 soccer in USL pro until the club folded in 2010. The USL pro club finished with the best record in the league in both the 2004 and 2009 regular seasons.

The announcement of the Timbers' entry into MLS was the culmination of a nearly two-year-long process for Merritt Paulson, dating back at least to May 2007, when Paulson led a group that bought the Portland Beavers and the USL Timbers. The group included former Treasury Secretary Henry Paulson, Meritt Paulson's father. The biggest issue for the city of Portland at that time was that due to league concerns about seating configuration, field surface and scheduling, obtaining an MLS club would require a new stadium.

In October 2007, Paulson was told PGE Park could be upgraded for about $20 million, and a new baseball stadium (with 8,000 to 9,000 seats) would cost about $30 million. By November 2008, Paulson told The New York Times he expected Portland taxpayers would spend $85 million to "build a new baseball stadium for his Beavers and renovate PGE Park—just remodeled in 2001 at a cost to taxpayers of $38.5 million—for soccer", and that in exchange, he would spend $40 million for the franchise fee to bring a new Major League Soccer team to Portland. MLS was in support of the proposal, wanting to continue to expand the number of owners in the league (for a while, all of its teams were owned by three men: Philip Anschutz, Lamar Hunt, and Robert Kraft).

Though supporting the acquisition of an MLS franchise raised numerous issues for Mayor Sam Adams and the Portland City Council, the Timbers were announced as Major League Soccer's eighteenth team on March 20, 2009, by Commissioner Don Garber. The announcement occurred during the first and second-round games of the 2009 NCAA Men's Division I Basketball Tournament that were held in Portland. The announcement noted that the team would retain the Portland Timbers name.

Former forward and Colorado Rapids assistant coach John Spencer was named the first head coach of the Timbers on August 10, 2010. It was also announced that former head coach Gavin Wilkinson of the USL-1/USSF D-2 Timbers, was promoted as the general manager/technical director of the team.

The Timbers signed five players before the MLS Expansion Draft on November 24, 2010. Three were part of the Timbers D-2 Pro League squad in 2010 (Steve Cronin, Bright Dike, and Ryan Pore), one was signed from D-2 Pro League team Austin Aztex (forward Eddie Johnson) and one was acquired via trade with New York Red Bulls (midfielder Jeremy Hall). On November 24, 2010, the Timbers, along with the other 2011 expansion team, Vancouver Whitecaps FC, participated in an MLS Expansion Draft, each selecting 10 players from existing teams. Immediately after the Expansion Draft, the Timbers announced the trade of their first pick (midfielder Dax McCarty), from FC Dallas to D.C. United for defender Rodney Wallace. The Timbers and Whitecaps also participated in the 2011 MLS SuperDraft on January 13, 2011, with the Whitecaps having the first pick, and the Timbers having the second pick. Vancouver surprised some by selecting youngster Omar Salgado and Portland swiftly selected Akron midfielder/forward Darlington Nagbe.

The Timbers played their first MLS game on March 19, 2011, against reigning MLS champions Colorado Rapids, but lost 3–1. The first goal in the Timbers' MLS era was scored by Kenny Cooper. In their first season, the Portland Timbers finished in 6th place in the Western Conference and 12th place overall.

On July 9, 2012, John Spencer was fired after a 0–3 loss to Real Salt Lake. Gavin Wilkinson took over on an interim basis for the rest of the season. The Timbers finished 2012 with the third-worst record in the league and was 8th out of 9th in the Western Conference. They did, however, win the Cascadia Cup in MLS for the first time.

Caleb Porter era (2013–2017)

The 2013 season began with new head coach Caleb Porter, who was previously head coach of the United States U-23 team and the University of Akron Zips men's team from 2006 to 2012. Under Porter, the Timbers achieved immediate success in the 2013 MLS regular season. They finished in first place in the Western Conference and third place in MLS overall. An important player was Diego Valeri, whom the Timbers had acquired from Club Atlético Lanús on loan with an option to purchase (which they exercised later in the season). In the 2013 Lamar Hunt U.S. Open Cup tournament, the club reached the semifinals, where they were eliminated by Real Salt Lake. The Timbers also earned their first MLS playoff appearance in franchise history. They defeated their archrival Seattle Sounders FC in the conference semifinals 5–3 on aggregate. The Timbers were eliminated in the conference finals, again losing to Real Salt Lake in a two–game aggregate series (5–2 aggregate). Due to a change by the United States Soccer Federation of how American-based MLS teams can qualify in the CONCACAF Champions League, the Portland Timbers qualified for the 2014–15 CONCACAF Champions League, which was their first international tournament they would later take part in.

In the 2014 MLS season, the Timbers could not replicate the success they had in the previous season. They struggled defensively in the beginning of the season with a 1–3–6 (W-L-D) record over the first ten games. They were able to mount a comeback late in the season, still having a chance on the final weekend to appear in the MLS playoffs but ultimately failing to qualify. The Timbers finished the season in 6th place in the Western Conference, 11th place overall. For the 2014–15 CONCACAF Champions League, the Timbers were drawn with Club Deportivo Olimpia and Alpha United in the group stage of the tournament. They were eliminated in the group stage on away goals. During the offseason, Portland's main focus was to avoid a slow start as they did in the 2014 season, made more difficult with Diego Valeri and Will Johnson being unavailable for the first several weeks due to injuries suffered in the final games of the 2014 season. New acquisitions included Nat Borchers from Real Salt Lake and Ghanaian/Norwegian keeper Adam Larsen Kwarasey.

MLS Cup champions (2015)
The 2015 season marked the franchise's fifth anniversary as an MLS franchise and the fortieth anniversary of the Timbers' legacy that traces back to the original North American Soccer League, which has been recognized by the team.

In 2015, the Timbers began their campaign without Diego Valeri and Will Johnson, who were still recovering from their injuries they obtained in the previous season. They would eventually return later in the season. The 2015 US Open Cup pitted Portland against arch-rival Seattle in the fourth round of the tournament, where they would eliminate the Sounders 3–1 in overtime, Seattle finished the match with only seven men after three players (including Clint Dempsey) were given red cards, and Obafemi Martins leaving due to a groin injury. Portland would be defeated by Real Salt Lake in the fifth round. In a highly competitive Western Conference, the Timbers once again qualified for the MLS Playoffs, finishing strong in the final matches of the regular season which included a 5–2 win against LA Galaxy. Portland finished the regular season third in the Western Conference, fifth overall.

Portland played against Sporting Kansas City in the MLS playoffs' Knockout round that went to penalties after Sporting's Kevin Ellis scored a late tying goal in the final minutes of regulation ending in 1–1. Maxi Urruti scored late in overtime tying 2–2 after Sporting had the lead from a goal from Kristen Nemeth in the 97th minute. The penalty shootout to decide the game went 11 rounds, with Sporting's Saad Abdul-Salaam unbelievably missing a potential game winning kick off of both posts. Kwarasey scored the winning goal and made the winning save in the 11th round of penalties. The game has been since dubbed, "The Double Post". The Timbers advanced to defeat Vancouver Whitecaps FC in the second leg of their two-game series, winning the Conference Semifinals 2–0. Portland defeated FC Dallas in the Conference Final series 5–3 aggregate with a 3–1 win at home and tying 2–2 in the second match in Toyota Park, becoming Western Conference Champions and advancing to their first-ever MLS Cup appearance. The Timbers won the 2015 MLS Cup against Columbus Crew SC 2–1 from the fastest MLS Cup goal from Diego Valeri, followed by a header from Rodney Wallace in the first half. Despite conceding a goal from Columbus striker Kei Kamara, the Portland Timbers held on to win their first MLS Cup and in doing so became the first team in the Cascadia rivalry to win the championship.

Following seasons (2016–17)
Portland's 2016 offseason consisted of transfers of key players including Jorge Villafaña, Will Johnson, Maxi Urruti, and Rodney Wallace. For the Timbers' 2016 campaign as defending champions, the season began with a win in a rematch against Columbus Crew SC. Portland's season in 2016 overall was described by head coach Caleb Porter as "A tale of two seasons." Although the team had a strong record at home, that performance was not reflected on the road, and the team dealt with injuries to key players throughout the season. The Timbers did not win a single match away from Providence Park in the season, finishing with a road record of 0–11–6 away from home and 12–14–8 (44 points) overall.

In 2017, the team made it a priority to improve the team's defense, an issue the previous year, along with adding reinforcements in the midfield. Portland acquired Roy Miller and David Guzmán from C.D. Saprissa. Nat Borchers, who was injured in 2016, was not offered a new contract with the Timbers, and ultimately the veteran defender decided to retire. The Timbers also signed Sebastián Blanco, who had been a teammate of Valeri at Lanús, from San Lorenzo. Mid-season the Timbers also acquired center-back Larrys Mabiala from the Turkish club Kayserispor. In the second half of the season, midfielder Valeri scored in nine consecutive games, setting a new MLS record. Portland qualified for the playoffs once more in their second-to-last match of the regular season, a 4–0 rout of D.C. United at Providence Park. The Timbers finished the season in first place in the Western Conference, also winning the Cascadia Cup for the second time as an MLS team. Portland were eliminated by the Houston Dynamo in the Western Conference Semifinal. For the first time a Timbers player received MLS's Landon Donovan MVP award, given to Valeri for scoring 20+ goals and earning 10+ assists, among other accomplishments; it was the most goals ever scored by a midfielder in MLS.

In the off-season, Caleb Porter resigned as head coach on November 16, 2017, parting ways with the franchise.

Giovanni Savarese era (2018–present)
On Dec 18, the Timbers officially announced former New York Cosmos head coach Giovanni Savarese as the team's new head coach, making him the third non-interim head coach for the Timbers since entering MLS. Despite starting their 2018 season without a win in their first five games, Savaraese and the Timbers finished their campaign strong, and would earn their second trip to the MLS Cup on December 8, 2018, where they would be defeated 2–0 by Atlanta United.

The 2019 season was overshadowed by the large renovation to Providence Park, which resulted in the addition of 4,000 seats on the east side of the stadium. The extensive construction meant that the Timbers played the first 12 matches of the season away from home. The team emerged from this extensive road trip with a marginal record of 4–6–2. Portland would largely fail to improve in their remaining home games. The Timbers finished the season with 49 points overall, which placed them 6th in the Western Conference. They went on to face Real Salt Lake in the 2019 playoffs in Salt Lake, which resulted in a 2–1 loss.

The Timbers began the 2020 Major League Soccer season with a loss at home against Minnesota United FC and a win against MLS expansion side Nashville SC. On March 12, 2020, the season then entered a lengthy suspension due to the COVID-19 pandemic in North America. On June 10, MLS announced that a bracket format dubbed the "MLS is Back Tournament" would begin July 8 at ESPN Wide World of Sports Complex in Walt Disney World, and end with the final on August 11.

Portland began the tournament drawn with LAFC, LA Galaxy, and the Houston Dynamo in Group F, which was dubbed the "Group of Death" by the media. The Timbers defeated Chicharito and the Galaxy 2–1 to open the tournament, downed Houston by the same score 5 days later, and then, assured of passage to the next round, came back to tie LAFC 2–2 while playing mostly their reserves to finish on top of the group.

In the Round of 16, Portland led FC Cincinnati before a late gaffe from goalkeeper Steve Clark forced the Timbers into a tie and penalty kicks. Clark redeemed himself in the shootout and Portland won 1–1 (4–2) to advance to the next round of knockout games. In the Round of 8, Portland fell behind New York City FC after conceding an early goal but scored 3 in a row in the second half to cruise to an easy 3–1 win, which was capped off by a stunning outside-the-box strike from Andy Polo. Playing the Philadelphia Union next in the semifinals, the Timbers rose to the challenge with goals from Jeremy Ebobisse and Sebastián Blanco and held on to score a 2–1 victory and advance to the finals for the club's first title game appearance since the 2018 MLS Cup.

In the MLS is Back Tournament championship game against hometown Orlando City, Portland opened the scoring with a diving header from Larrys Mabiala off a pass from Diego Valeri in the 27th minute. Orlando equalized in the 39th minute, but Portland scored again in the 66th minute after defender Dario Župarić scored his first goal as a Timber, and Portland's defense held on to win 2–1, making the Portland Timbers under Savarese the MLS is Back Tournament champions.

On August 26, 2020, Portland Timbers players, as part of the 2020 American athlete strikes, voted to strike and not play their game against the San Jose Earthquakes that night. The game was then rescheduled to September 16.

In 2021, the Timbers finished fourth in the Western Conference, then upset top-seeded Colorado Rapids and staved off a hot underdog in Real Salt Lake en route to their third Cup final as an MLS club. For the first time since Soccer Bowl '77, Portland would host the championship of top-flight American soccer as the Timbers faced New York City FC in the final. After a 94th-minute goal from forward Felipe Mora that canceled out a first-half score from league top-scorer Valentín Castellanos, the Timbers and NYCFC finished extra time levelled at 1–1. The Timbers had two penalties saved in the shoot-out and lost the Cup after a 4–2 result, marking their second loss in MLS Cup finals.

Abuse scandal and fallout (2021-present)

In late September 2021, The Athletic published an investigation into North Carolina Courage head coach Paul Riley, alleging that Riley had sexually coerced and verbally abused players on his teams, including during his two-year tenure as Portland Thorns head coach in 2014 and 2015. More than a dozen players from every team Riley had coached since 2010 spoke to the publication and two named players, both former Thorns, went on the record with allegations against him. In the article, Riley denied the allegations. The investigation led to widespread fan discontent, focused primarily on the fact that Riley was both hired and fired by Timbers/Thorns owner Paulson and GM Wilkinson. Wilkinson was placed on administrative leave from the Thorns in early October, but retained his positions with the Timbers. (He was eventually replaced by Karina LeBlanc.)

Timbers attendance declined during the 2022 season as the team failed to sell out all but five games. The smaller crowds were attributed in part to the COVID-19 pandemic as well as discontent among fans over the club's handling of abuse allegations and other controversies. The organization was also accused of supporting a "toxic workplace environment" for women by several employees, particularly from upper management. In addition, the club terminated the contract of recently re-signed forward Andy Polo following allegations of domestic abuse from his ex-partner.

The Yates Report, released on October 3, 2022, found further transgressions by members of the Timbers and Thorns organization, including alleged inappropriate conduct by president Mike Golub. The report and pressure from fans prompted Alaska Airlines, Tillamook, KeyBank, and other corporate sponsors to withhold, redirect, or cancel their financial contributions to the club. Paulson announced he, along with general manager Gavin Wilkinson (who was extended prior to the season) and Golub, would step away from the Thorns. On October 5, 2022, Wilkinson and Golub were fired from the club altogether. Ned Grabavoy handled Timbers front office duties in the interim.

On the pitch, the Timbers would lose the last game of the season against Real Salt Lake, knocking them out of playoff contention and lifting RSL in their place by one point.

Colors and badge 
The Portland Timbers' MLS logo incorporates elements of the former USL design. The primary reference to the original crest is the circular shape that represents unity, wholeness, and the pursuit of perfection. The axe pays homage to the Pacific Northwest's logging industry, as loggers traditionally used axes to cut down trees. There are three chevrons organized to resemble a pine tree that refer to the Timbers' membership in three separate leagues: the original North American Soccer League, the United Soccer Leagues, and Major League Soccer.  The team's colors, ponderosa green and moss green, represent the state of Oregon's forests.

Sponsor 

It was announced in September 2010 that the Portland Timbers' jerseys would be sponsored by Alaska Airlines. On December 9, 2010, the jersey was revealed at a runway show at Portland International Airport. The home jersey was a two-tone halved green shirt, while the alternate jersey was red in honor of Portland being known as the Rose City.

On February 23, 2021, it was announced that Portland had made a deal with TikTok, as team's sleeve sponsor beginning in the same year. Part of the deal included collaborative work for the company's 'TikTok for Good' campaign.

Uniform evolution 

Home, away, and alternative uniforms.

 Home

 Away

 Alternate

Stadium 

 Providence Park; Portland, Oregon (2011–present)

The Timbers play at Providence Park in downtown Portland, which they share with the Portland Thorns of the National Women's Soccer League. Providence Park has existed in Portland since 1893 and as a complete stadium since 1926, when it was constructed by the nearby Multnomah Athletic Club, which still borders the stadium on the southern end. Providence Park is the oldest soccer-specific stadium in Major League Soccer and one of the most historic grounds used by any United States professional soccer team.

The stadium has played host to many watershed moments in United States soccer history, including the Soccer Bowl '77, the 1999 and 2003 FIFA Women's World Cups, the 2013 CONCACAF Gold Cup, the 2014 MLS All-Star Game, the 2015 NWSL Championship Game, and MLS Cup 2021. Providence Park has been the home of the Portland Timbers in all of their iterations since 1975.

In July 2009, the Portland City Council approved a $31 million renovation to make the stadium ready for the 2011 Major League Soccer season, reconfiguring the grounds primarily for men and women's soccer. Operational capacity was 18,627 for the 2011 MLS season and expanded to 20,323 for the 2012 season.

On February 10, 2014, the Timbers signed a long-term stadium naming rights sponsorship with Providence Health & Services, a non-profit health care provider. The stadium will be known as Providence Park until at least 2028.

In December 2017, the Portland City Council approved for construction a US$85 million expansion project to increase seating capacity for Providence Park. The project, whose terms were already approved in June of the same year, added an additional 4,000 seats to the near 22,000 seats already built, increasing overall capacity by 20%. The stadium plan was in the works for several seasons as the Timbers had a season ticket waitlist of approximately 13,000.

The new remade steel stand was inspired by the legendary Boca Juniors' stadium La Bombonera as well as the classic raised stage of Shakespeare's Globe Theatre, creating a unique layered appearance that also paid homage to the original, unfinished 1926 Multnomah Field plans. Spelled out across the green seats on the East End in white lettering is "SC USA", a direct nod to Portland's history as "Soccer City USA".

The expanded Providence Park opened for the first time on July 1, 2019, as the Timbers hosted LAFC, selling out the capacity of 25,218. The expansion gave Providence Park the 4th-highest seating capacity of any soccer-specific stadium in MLS. Included in the renovation were the addition of three decks of new seats, two new video boards and a modern edge-to-edge roof, as well as updated LED lighting throughout the park.

Club culture

Supporters 

The Timbers sold out every home game from their transition to MLS in 2011 until the pandemic of 2020-2021, a league-record streak of 163 games. The Timbers cap season-ticket sales at 15,300, and at one point had a waitlist of 10,000 season tickets, larger than almost every college football team.

The main supporters group of the Portland Timbers is the Timbers Army. Its members are known for their loud, enthusiastic support and the raucous atmosphere they create at Timbers games, as well as their leftist political positions. The Timbers Army is consistently referred to by American media as one of the best, or very best, supporting groups in the country, with Timbers fans often given the same distinction.

The Timbers Army was founded in 2001 as the Cascade Rangers, a reference to the Cascade Range of mountains in the Pacific Northwest region of North America. The group began congregating in section 107 ("The Woodshed") of PGE Park ("The Piggy") to create a European-style rooting section for the club, complete with drumming, flags, scarves, smoke bombs and constant chanting and cheering. By 2002, the group had changed its name to the Timbers Army in order to lose any perception of partiality toward Scottish soccer club Rangers and because the Timbers uniforms at the time resembled those of Rangers rival Celtic. By 2012, the Timbers Army numbered more than 4,000 people in the north-end on match day.

In 2019, the Timbers Army made national news as they clashed with the MLS front office over the use of the Iron Front symbol on flags flown by Timbers supporters. MLS banned the anti-fascist symbol along with far-right regalia in a blanket ban of "political signage", which the Army contested, arguing in a statement that opposition to fascism, racism, and sexism was not political. A protracted public battle between the Army and MLS brass occurred, culminating in a protest during the August game against Seattle where the TA deliberately stayed silent for the first 33 minutes of the nationally televised clash to commemorate 1933, the year that the Iron Front was disbanded in Nazi Germany.

After the protests by the Timbers Army gained media exposure, Major League Soccer officials announced they would meet with the Army and other supporter groups around the league. A month later, on September 24, 2019, the league announced it would be reversing the policy that prohibited the Iron Front, allowing Timbers supporters to use the symbol again. This was a rare instance in American sports (and one of the first in MLS) that a supporter group had directly taken on the league with an organized response and forced a change in policy.

Rivalries 

The Cascadia Cup is a trophy and competition between the three soccer clubs of the Cascadia bioregion: the Timbers, Seattle Sounders FC, and the Vancouver Whitecaps. Portland, Seattle, and Vancouver were rivals back in the original NASL during the 1970s and all 3 were together in the USL from 2001 to 2008.

In 2004 supporters of the three clubs created the Cascadia Cup, a yearly trophy handed out to the club with the best overall head-to-head record between the Pacific Northwest three. The Cup moved to MLS in 2011 as all three clubs again played together in the same league. Portland has won the Cup five times: in 2009, 2010, 2012, 2017, and 2022.

Portland became the first team in Cascadia to win the MLS Cup, doing so in 2015.

Seattle Sounders

The Portland Timbers have a long-running rivalry with Seattle Sounders FC dating to the original North American Soccer League, as far back as 1975. Natural regional rivals from 1975 to 1982 in the North American Soccer League and from 2001 to 2008 in the USL First Division, the Portland Timbers–Seattle Sounders rivalry was continued after Portland entered MLS as an expansion team in 2011.

With the close proximity of the two cities, traveling fans of both sides witness hostile environments while visiting the opposing stadium. According to many players, the Seattle–Portland rivalry is one of the only true derbies that is present in American soccer. The rivalry has been cited by multiple sources as one of the most intense rivalries in not just MLS but North American soccer.

The Seattle-Portland rivalry rose to higher levels when they faced each other in the 2013 MLS playoffs in their two-game series where the Timbers eliminated their arch-rivals in their first-ever MLS postseason matchup. Portland faced the higher-seeded Seattle in the 2018 Western Conference Semifinals in another two-game series, forcing the Sounders into a dramatic tie on aggregate in extra time in their home stadium and subsequently advancing to the Conference Finals on penalty kicks.

To date, Portland has never lost to Seattle in the MLS Playoffs.

Vancouver Whitecaps

Vancouver Whitecaps FC, the other Cascadian team in the tri-rivalry from the NASL and USL, moved to MLS along with Portland in 2011. They compete along with Portland and Seattle in the Cascadia Cup. Portland and Vancouver's historic rivalry dates back to 1975 in the original North American Soccer League.

Compared to Portland-Seattle, Portland-Vancouver is considered "friendlier" on both the pitch and the stands. Members of the supporting groups between the two clubs even jointly celebrated together after Vancouver eliminated Portland from the 2010 USL Playoffs due to the shared move to MLS the next year. One reason for the less-intense rivalry for the time being could be simple geography (Portland is closer to Seattle than Vancouver) or Vancouver not attaining a similar level of sustained MLS success as the two other Cascadia clubs.

Many Whitecap players point to the Timbers as being their biggest rival, even while Vancouver has off-and-on rivalries with other Canadian teams. As of 2020, Portland holds a 12–7–7 W-D-L advantage over Vancouver in MLS play.

During the Timbers' 2015 MLS Cup run, they defeated Vancouver 2–0 on aggregate over a two-game series in the Western Conference semifinals.

Other teams

Portland fans in all sports have traditionally embraced a hatred of Los Angeles teams, and that has been no different in recent years in MLS play. Portland had a testy matchup with LAFC in the 2018 US Open Cup and followed it up the next year with an even more physical battle in the first game at the revamped Providence Park, leading MLS writer Brian Taylor to describe the matchup as a "new rivalry". In January 2020, Timbers midfielder Sebastian Blanco said that LAFC was Portland's biggest rival outside of Cascadia, and that he "loves to play those games" against them and the LA Galaxy. In the 2020 MLS is Back Tournament, Portland drew both LAFC and LA Galaxy in the initial group stage, where they defeated the Galaxy and came from behind to tie against LAFC en route to finishing on top of the group and winning the trophy.

Mascot 

During the NASL and USL years the team's mascot was a grizzled lumberjack named Timber Jim. On January 24, 2008, Jim announced his retirement. His final farewell was a game played against Puerto Rico Islanders on April 17, 2008, which the Timbers won 1–0.

Timber Joey served as the unofficial mascot from then on, and was inaugurated as the new official mascot at an exhibition game vs Juventus Primavera on June 14, 2008, a game the Timbers won 1–0, and has served in that capacity ever since, leading into their MLS inauguration in 2011. Joey continues Jim's trademark of cutting a round (or "cookie") from a large log with a chainsaw every time the Timbers score a goal. This round is presented to the goal-scoring player after the game. If the team achieves a shutout (clean sheet), the goalkeeper also receives a round. Timber Joey has his own custom jersey with Portland-based outdoor tool manufacturer Leatherman as the shirt sponsor.

Broadcasting 
From 2023, every Timbers match is available to stream via MLS Season Pass on the Apple TV app. Prior to Apple, the Timbers were a regular staple on local television in the Portland area, both cable and over-the-air.

Before 2023, regular-season games not televised by Major League Soccer's national television partners were broadcast by Root Sports Northwest. Selected games were broadcast in English by Fox affiliate KPTV (channel 12) or its co-owned MyNetworkTV affiliate KPDX (channel 49). It was formerly broadcast  in Spanish by Estrella TV affiliate KGW-DT3 (channel 8.3) from its inception until 2018 with the station ended its affiliation on the subchannel. Beginning in 2012, the team launched a regional syndication network, the Portland Timbers Broadcast Network, which provides the Timbers' over-the-air game coverage to additional markets. Partners of the network included the second digital subchannel of NBC affiliate KTVZ (channel 21.2) in Bend, Fox affiliate KEVU (channel 23) in Eugene and MyNetworkTV affiliate KFBI-LD (channel 48) in Medford. KPTV also airs a weekly highlight show, Timbers in 30, on Friday evenings; any future Timbers content remains unaffected by the 2023 Apple deal and teams will still be allowed to have local TV partners.

On the radio, all Timbers games are broadcast in English on KXL (750 AM, "The Game") and are simulcast in Spanish on KGDD (1150 AM and 93.FM, "La Gran D"). KXL also airs Talk Timbers, a weekly radio show dedicated to the team and soccer.

Roster and staff 

 For details on former players, see All-time Portland Timbers roster.

Current roster

Retired numbers

Coaching staff 
{| class="wikitable sortable"
|-
! style="background:#004812; color:#FFFFFF; border:2px solid #CB9700;" scope="col"|Title
! style="background:#004812; color:#FFFFFF; border:2px solid #CB9700;" scope="col"|Name
|-

Executive staff 
{| class="wikitable sortable"
|-
! style="background:#004812; color:#FFFFFF; border:2px solid #CB9700;" scope="col"|Title
! style="background:#004812; color:#FFFFFF; border:2px solid #CB9700;" scope="col"|Name
|-

Head coach history

General manager history

Club captain history

Ring of Honor 

Given to those involved with the Portland Timbers deserving of special honors. Currently there are only five members of this exclusive group:

Those inducted have their names displayed in the upper northeast corner of what is now Providence Park. Clive Charles' number was retired in a halftime ceremony on August 29, 2003, just three days after his death. Timber Jim's number was retired in a halftime ceremony on April 17, 2008. Timber Jim is currently the only non-player to be inducted to the Ring of Honor. Both John Bain and Jimmy Conway were unveiled as new members at halftime of the club's first ever MLS home game on March 19, 2011.
Mick Hoban was inducted on during a halftime ceremony on March 8, 2014.

Honors

Domestic 
 MLS Cup
 Champions (1): 2015
 Runners Up (2): 2018, 2021
 Western Conference Champions
 Winners (3): 2015, 2018, 2021
 Western Conference Regular Season
 Winners (2): 2013, 2017
 MLS is Back Tournament
 Champions: 2020

Minor honours
 MLS Fair Play Award: 2011

Continental 

 CONCACAF Champions League (best result):
 Quarter Finals: 2021

Portland Timbers 2 (T2) 

Portland Timbers 2 (T2) is the farm club of the Portland Timbers. In October 2014, Merritt Paulson announced the creation of their USL Pro team, Portland Timbers 2 (T2). T2 began play in the 2015 USL pro season, having Merlo Field as their stadium to play for their home games. The purpose of T2 is to bridge a gap between the academies and the first level team, while having a better way to observe the players' progress and development as well.

Records

Year-by-year 

This is a partial list of the last five seasons completed by the Timbers. For the full season-by-season history, see List of Portland Timbers seasons.

1. Avg. attendance include statistics from league matches only.
2. Top goalscorer(s) includes all goals scored in League, MLS Cup Playoffs, U.S. Open Cup, MLS is Back Tournament, CONCACAF Champions League, FIFA Club World Cup, and other competitive continental matches.

Attendance by season 

All regular-season home games since the Timbers' entry into MLS in 2011 have sold out, with the 100th such sell-out on September 10, 2016.

DNQ = Did not qualify

Top scorer by season

CONCACAF Champions League 
Portland has qualified for the CONCACAF Champions League three times, the first time being the 2014–15 edition of the tournament.

 Scores and results list Portland's goal tally first.

Table

Player statistics

Matches 

USOC = U.S. Open Cup; CCL = CONCACAF Champions League
Bolded players are currently on the Portland Timbers roster.

Goals 

USOC = U.S. Open Cup; CCL = CONCACAF Champions League
Bolded players are currently on the Portland Timbers roster.

Assists 

USOC = U.S. Open Cup; CCL = CONCACAF Champions League
Bolded players are currently on the Portland Timbers roster.

Footnotes

References

External links 

 

 
Association football clubs established in 2009
Soccer clubs in Oregon
Timbers
2009 establishments in Oregon
Major League Soccer teams
Phoenix clubs (association football)